Manchester High School is a public high school in Manchester, Georgia, United States, serving grades 9–12 for the Meriwether County School District. It was established in 1928.

References

External links

Public high schools in Georgia (U.S. state)
Educational institutions established in 1928
Schools in Meriwether County, Georgia
1928 establishments in Georgia (U.S. state)